Remote sensing is the acquisition of information about an object or phenomenon without making physical contact with the object.

Remote sensing may also refer to:
 Remote Sensing (journal), a scientific journal
 Remote sensing (archaeology)
 Remote sensing (geology)
 Remote sensing (oceanography)
 Four-terminal sensing or remote sensing, an electrical measurement technique

See also
Remote viewing, a claimed psychic ability